The PSA X engine is a family of internal combustion engines used in Citroën, Peugeot, Talbot and Renault automobiles.  The X family was mainly used in superminis and the entry level models of midsize vehicles. It was designed and manufactured by the company "Française de Mécanique", a joint venture created by Peugeot (as predecessor to Groupe PSA) and Renault in 1969, and built in Douvrin in northern France. It is commonly called the "Suitcase" engine, the "Douvrin" nickname being commonly used for the bigger 2.0-2.2 liter J-Type engine, which was also built in Douvrin.

The X design was introduced in 1972 with the Peugeot 104. It was an all-aluminium alloy SOHC inline-four design with two valves per cylinder driven by a chain, using petrol as fuel. It was applied transversely in front wheel drive vehicles only, tilted by an almost horizontal attitude of 72 degrees. The integral transmission is mounted on the rear side of the crankcase (thus appearing to be underneath the power unit when it is mounted in the vehicle), and is driven by transfer gears which give a distinctive "whine" - a trait shared with the BMC A-Series engine, which uses a similar construction. The side mounting of the transmission onto the crankcase is what gives rise to the nickname "suitcase engine", as the transmission and engine assemblies resemble two halves of a suitcase when they are split for disassembly.

The X was used until 1990 in PSA vehicles - Renault discontinued the unit in 1982 when it reverted to its own Cléon-Fonte engine powerplants when the R14 was replaced by the R9/R11. It was replaced in PSA vehicles by the more modern belt driven camshaft TU which was introduced in 1986 in the Citroën AX. The TU engine was fitted with the now conventional end-on gearbox with separate lubrication. The TU engine is an evolution of the X engine.

(*) These names have never been used, it is an extrapolation of these engines on the new Renault engine designation system.

In the beginning, Renault and Peugeot used the same motor types (Française de Mécanique designations), in the 1980s, each used its own designations.

The "X engine" type X5J (1360 cc) of the Renault 14 GTL (from 1982) is the only one to benefit from the new Renault designations. The designation of the engines is organized in 3 characters: a letter, a number, a letter (Example: C1J, X5J, F2N ...).
 The first letter designates the engine block: X ("X engine") or C ("Cleon-Fonte engine") ...;
 The number corresponds to the type of engine: 5 for hemispherical cylinder head gasoline, single body carburetor; 6 for hemispherical head gasoline, dual body carburetor; ...
 The last letter corresponds to the cubic capacity:
 G from 1150 to 1249 cc
 J from 1350 to 1449 cc

XV

The XV was installed in the Citroën LNA, Citroën Visa, Peugeot 104, Peugeot 205 and Talbot Samba.

XW

The XW was applied to the Citroën LNA, Citroën Visa, Citroën C15, Citroën BX, Peugeot 104, Peugeot 205 and Talbot Samba. The  version could be found in the sporty Visa X and the 1975 Peugeot 104 ZS.

XZ

The XZ had a brief career, and was applied to the Citroën Visa, Peugeot 104, Talbot Samba and Renault 14. The  could be found in the Peugeot 104 ZS Coupé and Talbot Samba Rallye, and their respective racing versions.

XY
The XY was introduced in the place of the XZ. This one could reach , depending on the model it was meant for and the level of tuning.

The  variant could be seen in deluxe versions of these models, such as the Samba Cabrio and 205 XT, the Citroën BX and the Renault 14 TS. The  version was reserved for the intermediate sports levels Visa GT, 205 XS/GT, Samba S and the 104ZS. The two most powerful variants were used exclusively in the Visa Chrono and Chrono II, which had a successful career in rallying, especially in France.

Sources
Guide des moteurs Peugeot Citroën (in French)

X
X
X
Gasoline engines by model
Straight-four engines